Pretoria Wireless Users Group is a South African wireless users group. It is non-profit community organisation providing a wireless community network in Pretoria, the capital of South Africa.

PTAWUG has been created as the community’s answer to South Africa’s restrictive telecommunications environment. The South African telecommunications industry has been marked by poor service delivery, monopolistic practices and prohibitively high prices.
  
Founded on 28 July 2007, PTAWUG embodies the African spirit of Ubuntu. Its constitution guarantees openness, free participation and equality to all members of the Wireless User Group. PTAWUG is exclusively funded by donations from the community. Highsite installation and maintenance is conducted by volunteers in their spare time. PTAWUG exemplifies the proverbial open source Bazaar – no management team, no hierarchies, equal participation.

PTAWUG is the 3rd largest wireless network organisation in the world, behind AWMN (Greece), TWMN (Greece). These two networks provide internet as well, which PTAWUG doesn't, so counting community networks that don't provide internet - PTAWUG is the largest on earth.

The aim of the network is to provide free TCP/IP communications in and around South Africa’s capital to hobbyists, researchers and other non-commercial users. The network is used for gaming, voip, file transfers and various other IP based services. 

PTAWUG connects members from vastly different backgrounds and social standings and provides a sandbox for technology experimentation and community skills development.

Community 

PTAWUG unites a number of people in the IT field, sharing of information as well as learning helps the member to progress. The community is responsible for the network - volunteers maintain the highsites physically as well as the software configuration thereof.

This knowledge and these skills which are learnt by "playing" with WiFi networks is very valuable to South Africa and Africa as there is a great skills shortage in South Africa and on the continent.

PTAWUG is an inclusive network, no one is denied access, it is built totally on openness and collaboration between members. There is no hierarchy on the network, all users are equal. The ages of members connected to PTAWUG range from teens to 60+, different income groups and races are represented as well. 

There is an administration team that keeps the technical side of the network running, consisting of about 25 people. 

Regular meetings are held where new developments are discussed, the great South African tradition of a braai is part of these meetings.

The main communication medium on PTAWUG is IRC as this technology enables all the 'wuggers' to speak to each other, using PCs or cellphones, at the same time to easily plan expansion or discuss hardware/software problems on the network.

Many of the skills members learn by using and being involved in the network they apply in their careers.

Network Infrastructure 
The lack of a stable periodical income prevents PTAWUG from renting equipment space on commercial towers in and around Pretoria, and all highsites are put up on privately owned properties, with the permission of the owners. Private properties and homes located in high areas are most frequently used for highsites as they have a good line of sight to the surrounding areas providing greater coverage for connecting clients. There are currently four towers in use of which three were built by the members as a team and access to the other one was arranged by one of the members. The rest of the highsites are located either on high buildings (like office blocks) or at private residences in strategic places.

Some facts and stats:
 Some users use Linksys WRT54GL routers to connect as well as Ubiquity Nanostations.
 The IEEE 802.11a (5.8 GHz) standard is preferred over IEEE 802.11b or IEEE 802.11g (2.4 GHz) as commercialisation in the 2.4 GHz range over recent years is a cause of high noise levels (measured in SNR or Signal to Noise Ratio), especially with commercial service providers distributing ADSL WiFi Modems freely with their service contracts.
 There are 700 km of point to point backbone links running on PTAWUG, mostly using 27dbi grid antennas and running at 48Mbit/s.
 Network throughput may vary from a few kB/second up to as much as 4 MB/second depending on factors including network load, signal strength, signal quality and route length.
 The Border Gateway Protocol BGP routing protocol is used to build and distribute the routing table between the highsites with static routing used for last mile routing purposes.
 The community are constantly testing and trying different wireless Quality of service (QOS) implementations to improve network usability and speed.

Services Provided 
All services are community built.  The nature of the TCP/IP network provided serves as an opportunity for any user to install and provide Servers or services for many possible applications. Due to the cost of Internet Services in South Africa, many of these services provide free and open access to services that would otherwise deem a costly exercise.
 A weather station located in Moreleta Park, Pretoria is linked directly to the network - http://weather.bresler.co.za to be accessed freely by wug members.
 A myriad of popular gaming servers are hosted by users and on-line games are played on a daily basis.
 A VoIP server enables users to talk to each other via software and hardware phones.
 Open Source repositories are shared on a regular basis.
 Users share and contribute their programming and networking skills.
 Wugtube, User's videos as well as the hard work on High Sites are shared on a server similar to YouTube.

Collaboration 

 The Pretoria Wireless Users Group works closely with the Johannesburg Area Wireless Users Group (JAWUG) - they have two backbone links running between them - 22 km and 55 km. PTAWUG also swaps ideas with Cape Town Wireless Users Group (see: http://www.ctwug.za.net/) and Durban Wireless Community.
 http://www.mybroadband.co.za, a well known local technology news website also supports both PTAWUG and Jawug by providing the wugs with publicity as well as sponsoring meetings. On 30 December 2008 mybroadband sponsored R4600 towards the PTAWUG Lyttleton highsite.

Growth 

In the past year (2007-2008) the network has exploded from 4 users to 500+ users, all helping each other, playing games, sharing tips etc.
The network grows at the rate about 10 new users a month. PTAWUG has also extended its network by connecting to several other wireless networks including JAWUG (Johannesburg Wireless Users Group). The exponential growth is mainly attributable to the free-for-all and open community principals governing PTAWUG, as users contribute their time, income and knowledge freely without hindrance of a governing body. The vast interest in IT and ICT amongst a very broad range of South Africans, coupled with the limitations in affordable South African commercial communication solutions further ensure rapid growth of PTAWUG, and other South African wireless user groups.

See also 
 South African wireless community networks
 List of wireless community networks in South Africa

 Other wireless networks operating in and around Pretoria
 The Mereka Institute at the CSIR is operating a Pretoria Mesh

References 

 http://www.ptawug.co.za Pretoria Wireless User Group
 http://www.wug.za.net South Africa Wireless User Groups
 http://wirelessafrica.meraka.org.za/wiki/index.php/Links Meraka - Wireless Africa
 http://mybroadband.co.za/news/wireless/15676-ICASA-gives-PTAWUG-high-site-stamp-approval.html - ICASA gives PTAWUG high site stamp of approval
 http://mybroadband.co.za/news/wireless/14088-Free-high-speed-community-network-shows-sustainability.html - Free, high speed community network shows sustainability
 http://mybroadband.co.za/news/wireless/13084-Free-wireless-network-Thousand-and-counting.html - Free wireless network: Thousand and counting
 http://www.icasa.org.za/Legislation/ELECTRONICCOMMUNICATIONSACT/tabid/168/ctl/ItemDetails/mid/590/ItemID/59/Default.aspx ICASA Electronic Communications Act
 https://web.archive.org/web/20080704174905/http://www.businessleadership.org.za/documents/12568Telecomm_web.pdf Telecommunications prices in South Africa
 http://mybroadband.co.za/news/Wireless/4183.html - Free networks gain ground, MyADSL, South African Technology News website
 http://mybroadband.co.za/news/Telecoms/6180.html - Free networks grow, MyADSL, South African Technology News website
 http://mybroadband.co.za/news/Wireless/8478.html - No Speed Limits, No Caps
 http://blog.sabinet.co.za/2009/09/03/wireless-user-groups/ - Blog entry about PTAWUG
 https://archive.today/20101221042700/http://www.techtalk.za.net/2008/12/09/wireless-user-groups-wug-free-bandwidth/ - Blog post, Wireless User Groups (WUG), Free bandwidth?
 https://web.archive.org/web/20101221042136/http://www.mpld.co.za/forum/viewtopic.php?t=2910 - Forum entry and pictures of the installation of Die Wilgers tower
 http://weather.bresler.co.za/ - Pretoria Weather Station also accessible from inside the network

External links 
 PTAWUG Homepage
 PTAWUG Facebook page

Telecommunications in South Africa
Organizations established in 2007
2007 establishments in South Africa